"23" is a song by American record producer Mike Will Made It featuring American singer Miley Cyrus and American rappers Wiz Khalifa & Juicy J; released on September 10, 2013 by Interscope Records. The song was written by Mike Will Made It alongside the rappers, Pierre Ramon Slaughter, and Rock City. "23", which is a hip hop song, is set to a midtempo beat and lyrically references Air Jordan sneakers and recreational drug use.

"23" received generally mixed reviews from music critics, who were ambivalent towards its production and Cyrus' rapping ability. It peaked at number 11 on the U.S. Billboard Hot 100, and charted moderately internationally. An accompanying music video was filmed in Brooklyn on August 26, 2013, and premiered through Vevo on September 24, 2013. Cyrus performed the song during the first and second leg of her Bangerz Tour.

Production and composition

During the production of "23", Mike Will Made It prepared a verse for himself to rap, which he originally planned to include alongside verses by Juicy J and Wiz Khalifa. However, after the latter two finished their respective recordings, Mike Will Made It decided that his contribution should be replaced by a woman. Mike Will Made It had recently finished producing Miley Cyrus' track "We Can't Stop" for her fourth studio album Bangerz (2013) when she first heard "23" and expressed interest in being included on the track. Mike Will Made It was initially hesitant of her suggestion, having met her earlier that day, although he "left her on there" after "she laid down the verse [and] killed it."

"23" is a synth-driven hip hop song set to a midtempo beat and a "bass-heavy" arrangement. It is distinguished in Cyrus' catalog as the first track in which she raps. In the chorus, Cyrus mentions recreational drug use, particularly in the line "I’m in the club high off purp with some shades on". The track later transitions into the repeated hook "J's on my feet" delivered by Juicy J, which references Air Jordan sneakers.

Critical reception 
In a favorable review, Mike Wass of Idolator was complimentary of Mike Will Made It's "slick, multi-layered production" and was indifferent towards Cyrus' contributions. Sharing a similar sentiment, a writer for That Grape Juice stated that the artists "[gave] fans just what they want", adding that they "[went] along to make the jam the smash that it is." Complex ranked "23" at number 23 on their list of the 50 best songs of 2013, saying that Mike Will Made It knew that Miley would make this collaboration even better.
However, in a more mixed review, Danielle Cheesman of MSN opined that "the song sounds like everything else Mike WiLL's touched and turned to gold so it will be a smash but, much to Miley's chagrin, it won't be because of her", and criticized Cyrus' verses for "[stealing 2 Chainz's] whole flow." Tony Maglio from The Wrap also questioned her lyrical content, specifically criticizing the lyrics "I back it up, cause I don’t give a fuck" and "I’m MC Hammer fly." Jordan Sargent from Spin called the track "far from Mike Will's best work" and negatively compared Cyrus' delivery to that of Lil Debbie.

Commercial performance
In the United States, "23" entered the Billboard Hot 100 at number 70, and later peaked at number 11. It additionally peaked at number 2 on the Billboard Hot R&B/Hip-Hop Songs component chart.

Elsewhere in North America, the track reached number 26 on the Canadian Hot 100. In Europe, "23" respectively peaked at numbers 19 and 85 on the UK Singles Chart and the UK R&B Chart, both of which are organized by the Official Charts Company. The track respectively peaked at numbers 27 and 1 on the Ultratip component charts in Flanders and Wallonia, representing the fifty songs that failed to reach the flagship Ultratop chart in each Belgian region. It also peaked at number 30 on the French Syndicat National de l'Édition Phonographique, and number 44 on the Spanish Productores de Música de España. In Oceania, "23" reached number 39 on the Australian ARIA Charts and number 22 on the Official New Zealand Music Chart.

Music video
An accompanying music video for "23" was filmed at Bishop Ford Central Catholic High School in Brooklyn on August 26, 2013; it was directed by Hannah Lux Davis. An advertisement for a casting call posted to Juicy J's Instagram account requested "edgy, rebellious, sexy, [and] hood types" to appear as extras in the clip, and further stated that individuals "must wear [their] favorite pair of Jordans".

The music video was premiered through Vevo on September 24. The music video takes place in a high school; it begins with the school principal leaving his office, which Mike Will Made It enters and begins playing "23" on a Beats Pill over the intercom. Interspersed throughout are scenes of Cyrus wearing a bikini similar to Michael Jordan's Chicago Bulls basketball jersey; she is frequently shown smoking in the bathroom and writing on its mirrors with red lipstick. Khalifa raps his verse in a chemistry lab, while Juicy J's verse is rapped in a trophy room. A school-wide pep rally later takes place, where Cyrus is gyrating against Mike Will Made It and notably wearing the foam finger used in her controversial performance at the 2013 MTV Video Music Awards in August. Cash Money rappers Birdman and Mack Maine make cameos.

Critics were divided in their opinions for the music video. In a more favorable review, Zayda Rivera of Daily News stated that Cyrus is "undoubtedly the star of the video" and that the "ultimate cameo takes place when Cyrus brings back the infamous foam finger she waved and gyrated against during her MTV Video Music Awards performance". Ray Rahman from Entertainment Weekly recognized the prominent 1990s influence throughout the clip, and felt it was "reminiscent" to the visuals for "Make 'Em Say Uhh!" by Master P. In a more critical review, Carl Williott of Idolator opined that the music video was "sort of like a massive hip-hop version of the "Smells Like Teen Spirit" video, with Air Jordans and Beats instead of anarchy symbols", while Kayla Upadhyaya from The Michigan Daily called it a "pile of red and black vomit and a poorly edited mishmash of uninspired shots".

Live performances
Cyrus performed the song during the first and second legs of her Bangerz Tour. During the third leg of the tour, "23" was replaced with The Beatles' "Lucy in the Sky with Diamonds". During the performance, Cyrus wore black-and-red Jordan 1s, a striped fishnet bikini and crotchless leather chaps with "Miley" scrawled down the side, through which she paid homage to Christina Aguilera's "Dirrty" music video. Aguilera herself approved of the outfit and named Cyrus her dirrty girl successor, writing, "Cheers from one dirrty girl to the next @MileyCyrus...wear em' loud & proud, girl- yes!!" on her Twitter account. Jane Stevenson of the Toronto Sun praised the performance and wrote that it saw Cyrus finally twerk it out with her dancers.

Charts

Weekly charts

Year-end charts

Certifications

Release history

References 

2013 debut singles
2013 songs
Juicy J songs
Miley Cyrus songs
Wiz Khalifa songs
Interscope Records singles
American hip hop songs
Songs about drugs
Music videos directed by Hannah Lux Davis
Song recordings produced by Mike Will Made It
Songs written by Mike Will Made It
Songs written by Wiz Khalifa
Songs written by Juicy J
Songs written by Theron Thomas
Songs written by Timothy Thomas
Songs written by Pierre Ramon Slaughter